Wenzhou Museum is a museum run by the city of Wenzhou, located on Shifu Road, Lucheng District.

Description
It was Wenzhou's first general museum. During the Cultural Revolution the museum was closed and incorporated into , but in 1981 it was established again as Wenzhou Museum.

In early October 2003, Wenzhou Museum opened a new location on the west side of Shiji Plaza on a trial basis. After a month, it was closed again to be improved, then officially opened on 12 January 2004. Entry became free in March 2008. The new location occupies an area of about 2.34 hectares, and the building's floor area is 26,000 square meters, with an exhibition area of 12,000 square meters. The exhibits include history, painting, calligraphy, pottery, nature, handicrafts, the Wang Weixin Copperplate Exhibition Room, and temporary exhibits. The architectural design of the new museum was inspired by the Yandang Mountains. The entrance is decorated with banyan tree sculptures, and on the granite walls of the lobby are nine hanging copper sculptures depicting Chinese myths: Pangu separating heaven and earth, Nüwa mending the sky, Kuafu chasing the sun, Jingwei filling the sea, Hou Yi shooting at the suns, Chang'e flying to the moon, Shennong and Fuxi, Suiren making fire, and Yu the Great taming the floods. The history section was remodeled starting in 2015, and was reopened on a trial basis on 21 January 2017, then officially opened on International Museum Day, 18 May 2017.

The museum has a collection of more than 30,000 artifacts in 20 categories, including bronzeware, pottery, painted sculptures, lacquerware, and painting and calligraphy. Its most distinctive items are pottery, painted sculptures, paintings, and calligraphy.

Gallery

References

External links

National first-grade museums of China
Culture in Wenzhou
Buildings and structures in Wenzhou
Museums in Zhejiang